Stevenage Football Club is an English association football club based in Stevenage, Hertfordshire. The team competes in League Two, the fourth tier of English football. The club was formed in 1976 as Stevenage Borough F.C. following the bankruptcy of the town's former team, Stevenage Athletic. They took on senior status and played their first competitive match in the United Counties Football League in August 1980. They have played their home games at Broadhall Way since the club's formation.

This list details the club's achievements in first-team competitions, and the top goalscorer for each season. Top goalscorers highlighted in yellow were also the top scorers in the division Stevenage were competing in that season.

History
In their first season as a senior club, the team won the United Counties League Division One championship, as well as the United Counties League Cup. In 1984, the club joined Division Two North of the Isthmian League, and the following season earned promotion to Division One. Two years later, the club was relegated, before winning the Division Two North title during the 1990–91 season after amassing 107 points. During the 1993–94 season the club won the Isthmian Premier Division, and were promoted to the Football Conference. Two seasons later, they won the Conference, but were denied promotion to the Football League due to insufficient ground facilities. The 1996–97 season saw the club progress to the third round of the FA Cup for the first time. The following season, Stevenage reached the fourth round, where they drew Premier League club Newcastle United, drawing 1–1 at Broadhall Way, before losing the replay 2–1 at St James' Park.

During the 2001–02 season, Stevenage reached the FA Trophy final for the first time, losing 2–0 to Yeovil Town at Villa Park. Two years later, during the 2004–05 season, the club made the play-offs after finishing fifth under the guidance of manager Graham Westley, losing in the final 1–0 to Carlisle United at the Britannia Stadium. The club reached the FA Trophy final again during the 2006–07 season, where they came back from 2–0 down to defeat Kidderminster Harriers 3–2 in front of a record FA Trophy crowd of 53,262 at the new Wembley Stadium. The team reached the final again two years later, and beat York City 2–0. Stevenage won promotion to the Football League after winning the Conference Premier during the 2009–10 season. The team amassed 99 points for the season; finishing 11 points clear at the top of the table. Had the club's two victories against Chester City counted, Stevenage would have broken the record for the number of points any club has accumulated over any Conference Premier season, recording 105 points. The club's promotion during the 2009–10 season meant that Stevenage would be competing in League Two for the first time in their history.

Stevenage finished sixth in their first season in the Football League, reaching the play-offs, where they defeated Torquay United 1–0 in the Final at Old Trafford in May 2011, meaning the club had earned back-to-back promotions into League One. During the same season, Stevenage reached the Fourth Round of the FA Cup, defeating Newcastle United 3–1 at Broadhall Way, before eventually losing to Reading in the following round. In the club's first season in League One during the 2011–12 season, the team achieved their highest league finish to date, reaching the play-offs after finishing in sixth place. They went on to lose in the play-off semi-final. Stevenage also reached the Fifth Round of the FA Cup for the first time in their history that season, eventually losing 3–1 to Tottenham Hotspur in a replay at White Hart Lane, after the two teams drew at Broadhall Way. The club suffered relegation back to League Two during the 2013–14 season. It was almost an immediate return to League One the following year as the club reached the play-offs courtesy of a sixth-placed finish, although lost at the semi-final stage. 

The club were in last place in League Two during the 2019–20 season when the season was suspended due to the COVID-19 pandemic in March 2020. Stevenage were initially relegated following an independent disciplinary panel's decision to deduct Macclesfield Town, who had not paid their players on six separate occasions during the campaign, two points. The English Football League successfully appealed the sanctions meaning Stevenage retained their League Two status.

Seasons

Key
Key to colours and symbols:

Key to league record:
P = Played
W = Matches won
D = Matches drawn
L = Matches lost
F = Goals for
A = Goals against
Pts = Points
Pos = Final position

Key to league competitions:
Conf = Conference National
Isth-1 = Isthmian Division One
Isth-2N = Isthmian Division 2 North
Isth-P = Isthmian Premier Division
L1 = League One
L2 = League Two
UCL-1 = United Counties League Division One
UCL-P = United Counties League Premier Division

Key to cup record:
PRER = Preliminary Round
QR1 = First Qualifying Round
QR3 = Third Qualifying Round
QR4 = Fourth Qualifying Round
R1 = Round 1
R1S = Round 1 Southern Section
R2 = Round 2
R2S = Round 2 Southern Section
R3 = Round 3
R4 = Round 4
R4S = Round 4 Southern Section
R5 = Round 5
R16S = Round of 16 Southern Section
QF = Quarter-finals
SF = Semi-finals
SFS = Semi-finals Southern Section
RU = Runners-up
W = Winners

Footnotes

A. : Includes goals scored in the FA Cup, FA Vase, Football League Trophy, Conference National (including playoffs), Football League (including playoffs), Football League Cup, FA Trophy and Conference League Cup.

B. : Stevenage joined the United Counties League Division One league before the start of the 1980–81 season.

C. : Stevenage did not enter the FA Cup until the 1983–84 season. The club were also ineligible to enter the FA Trophy until the club reached the Isthmian Division One in the 1986–87 season. As a result of the club's relegation back to the Isthmian Division 2 North in 1988, Stevenage were again ineligible to enter the FA Trophy until 1991.

D. : Stevenage joined the Isthmian Division 2 North for the 1984–85 season as a result of a re-structuring of the National League System.

E. : The 1984–85 season saw the introduction of three points for a win. Although this rule came into play for the Football League in 1981, it was not introduced in the Isthmian League until 1984.

F. : After winning the Football Conference in the 1995–96 season, Stevenage were denied promotion to the Football League due to insufficient ground facilities.

G. : The first time the club reached the FA Cup first round proper.

H. : Lost in the play-off final to Carlisle United 1–0 at the Britannia Stadium.

I. : Lost in the play-off semi-final to Cambridge United 4–3 on aggregate.

J. : Chester City were expelled from the league on 26 February 2010 and their results were expunged on 8 March. Therefore, Stevenage's 1–0 and 2–0 victories over them were removed from the records. Consequently, there were 44 Conference Premier fixtures during the 2009–10 season, as opposed to 46.

K. : Stevenage beat Torquay United 1–0 in the 2010–11 play-off final at Old Trafford, meaning the club were promoted to League One.

L. : Lost in the play-off semi-final to Sheffield United 1–0 on aggregate.

M. : Lost in the play-off semi-final to Southend United 4–2 on aggregate.

N. : The 2019–20 season was ended early due to the COVID-19 pandemic. EFL clubs voted to end the season with immediate effect on 15 May 2020, with the final league table being determined on a points-per-game basis.

References
General

Specific

Seasons
 
Stevenage